Kakutani's theorem is a result in geometry named after Shizuo Kakutani.  It states that every convex body in 3-dimensional space has a circumscribed cube, i.e. a cube all of whose faces touch the body.  The result was further generalized by Yamabe and Yujobô to higher dimensions, and by Floyd to other circumscribed parallelepipeds.

References 

. 
. 
.

Theorems in convex geometry